Forces of nature are literally natural phenomena.

Figuratively, the term is also used to describe a thing or person that exhibits qualities which appear to be beyond outside control.

Force or Forces of Nature may also refer to:

Science
Fundamental interaction, including gravity, electromagnetism, and the strong and weak interactions of particle physics

Books
 Force of Nature (comics), fictional team of supervillains
 Forces of Nature (book), 2016 book by Brian Cox and Andrew Cohen
Force of Nature, 2018 novel by Jane Harper

Film and TV
 Forces of Nature (1999 film), a 1999 American romantic comedy film
 Forces of Nature (2004 film), a wide-screen documentary about volcanoes, earthquakes, and tornadoes
 Max Steel: Forces of Nature, 2005 American film 
 "Force of Nature" (Star Trek: The Next Generation)
 Force of Nature: The David Suzuki Movie  (2010), a documentary about environmental activist David Suzuki
 "Forces of Nature" (Teen Titans), the fourth episode of the first season of the series Teen Titans
 Forces of Nature (TV series), a BBC documentary series presented by Brian Cox
 Force of Nature (2020 film), an American action film

Music

Artists
Force of Nature (duo), a Japanese DJ and production duo

Albums
 Forces of Nature (album), an album by the American band Artension
 Force of Nature (Tank album), an album by American R&B artist Tank
Force of Nature (Koko Taylor album)

Songs
 "Force of Nature", a song from the Bea Miller album Not an Apology
 "Force of Nature" a song by the Oasis from the album Heathen Chemistry
 "Force of Nature", a song by Pearl Jam from the album Backspacer

Other
 The "Forces of Nature", a group of Pokémon species introduced in Pokémon Black and White (Tornadus, Thundurus, Landorus and Enamorus)
 "The Force of Nature" is Italian artist Lorenzo Quinn's series of sculptures depicting Mother Nature hurling a globe around on a sling